Petrus Steyn, officially renamed Mamafubedu, is a small farming town between Tweeling and Kroonstad, 35 km north-east of Lindley in the Free State province of South Africa. It is at the centre of an agricultural area known for wheat, maize, sunflower, potato, cattle,  hunting, sheep production and forms part of the breadbasket in the Free State. It is the highest town above sea level in the Free State.

History of the town

Petrus Steyn was born on 23 June 1842 in Robertson, Western Cape province of South Africa and died on 7 November 1897. The town was supposed to be called Concordia, but the widow of the late Mr Petrus Paulus Steyn sold it on condition that the new town be named after her husband. The farm Sterkfontein was then sold out of the will of Mr Steyn for the price of 4 pounds & 5 shillings per acre, which was bought on 11 October 1912, the official date that Petrus Steyn, the town, was established.

The Renoster River has its origin on erf 502, just next to the Petrus Steyn family grave yard. The area is now being developed into a Heritage and community park.

Monuments

Afrikaanse Taalmonument

An Afrikaans Language Monument was created out of stones stacked by visitors on 14 August 1975, in celebration of the centenary of the Afrikaans Language.

Ox Wagon Wheel Monument

The Ox Wagon Wheel monument was erected in 1938, during the centenary celebrations of the Great Trek. Here, ox wagon tracks and footprints that were made by Voortrekker leader Sarel Cilliers is preserved on a concrete slab. The above two monuments are found at the town civic centre at Dirkie Uys square, named after Dirkie Uys, the son of Piet Uys who led a punitive expedition against the Zulus after they killed Piet Retief and his 70 men at Dingane's kraal (settlement).

Hooggelegen Monuments

On the R707 towards Frankfort, at a farm called Hooggelegen, three monuments of historical significance are found. These commemorate the 1938 centenary of the Great Trek and the rebels who died during the Maritz rebellion of 1914.

Dutch Reformed Church Sandstone parsonage

The sandstone parsonage of the local Dutch Reformed Church was the place where a portion of the 1933 Bible translation from Dutch to Afrikaans was completed by Reverent Steyn who was responsible for the books of Acts and Johannes and lived in the parsonage from 1930 to 1933. The parsonage was declared a national monument in 1988 and is situated on Du Plessis street.

Heritage Sites

Petrus Steyn grave yard

The family grave yard of Petrus Steyn was laid out in 1898 under the oak tree and the area is now part of the Rhino Heritage Park.The oak tree is the oldest known tree in town.

General Cornelis H. Olivier.

General Cornelis Hermanus Olivier (1851–1924) one of the delegates sent to sign the Peace Treaty of Vereeniging to end the Second Anglo Boer War on 31 May 1902. He was a Boer General and lived in the Lindley district where he had a farm. He lies buried at the old Petrus Steyn cemetery.

Elandskop Hill

Elandskop Hill is located west of the town and during the Second Anglo-Boer War 1899–1902 was an excellent observation post for the Boer and British. For the Boer forces it was a particularly important heliograph station, especially because the headquarters of General Christiaan de Wet and also the Orange Free State Government were located there for a long time near the present-day town. The hill is 17121m above sea level in the Free State

Petrus Steyn train station

Lastly is the train station, which was first opened in 1925, was through a rail link to Heilbron. Later in the 1930s the line was extended further to Lindley and to a connection with the main line at Arlington. The 92-year-old building has now recently been declared a heritage site and will soon become home to Elandskop Museum.

Farming

Mamafubedu is also one of the biggest producers of potatoes which is supplied to Lays and Simba.

The origin of the Renoster river

The Renoster River is a tributary of the Vaal River in South Africa. The river originates in Petrus Steyn in the Free State. From its origin, the river flows north west, passing Heilbron into the Koppies Dam. From there, it flows beyond Koppies as it flows under the N1 national road. Near Viljoenskroon it flows northwest, flows under the R59 and R501 and joins the Vaal River at Renovaal, about 25 km east of Orkney.

See also

Treaty of Vereeniging
Second Boer War

References

External links
freestatetourism.org
riemlandroute.co.za
southafrica.net 
tripadvisor.co.za

Great Trek
Second Boer War
Populated places in the Nketoana Local Municipality
Populated places established in 1912
1912 establishments in South Africa